In economics, compensating variation (CV) is a measure of utility change introduced by John Hicks (1939).  'Compensating variation' refers to the amount of additional money an agent would need to reach their initial utility after a change in prices, a change in product quality, or the introduction of new products. Compensating variation can be used to find the effect of a price change on an agent's net welfare. CV reflects new prices and the old utility level.  It is often written using an expenditure function, e(p,u):

The first equation can be interpreted as saying that, under the new price regime, the consumer would accept CV in exchange for allowing the change to occur.

More intuitively, the equation can be written using the value function, v(p,w):

one of the equivalent definitions of the CV.

Notice that in this second example the CV is computed from the point of view of the government, in this case the CV measures the tax (or if negative the subsidy) the government has to give to the consumer in order to let him reach his old utility with the new system of prices. The only practical change is that the sign of the CV is changed. This change of perspective often occurs in order to have the same sign of the Equivalent variation.

Compensating variation is the metric behind Kaldor-Hicks efficiency; if the winners from a particular policy change can compensate the losers it is Kaldor-Hicks efficient, even if the compensation is not made.

Equivalent variation (EV) is a closely related measure that uses old prices and the new utility level.  It measures the amount of money a consumer would pay to avoid a price change, before it happens.  When the good is neither a normal good nor an inferior good, or when there are no income effects for the good (in particular when utility is quasilinear), then EV (Equivalent variation) = CV (Compensating Variation) = ΔCS (Change in Consumer Surplus)

See also 
 Equivalent variation (EV) is a closely related measure of welfare change.

References
 Hicks, J.R. Value and capital: An inquiry into some fundamental principles of economic theory, Oxford: Clarendon Press, 1939
 Brynjolfsson, E., Y. Hu, and M. Smith. "Consumer Surplus in the Digital Economy: Estimating the Value of Increased Product Variety at Online Booksellers," Management Science: 49, No. 1, November, pp. 1580-1596. 2003.
 Greenwood, J. and K.A. Kopecky. "Measuring the Welfare Gain from Personal Computers," Economic Inquiry: 51, No. 1, pp. 336-347. 2013.

Welfare economics